Willard Allen may refer to:

Willard Allen (politician) (born 1940), American politician
Willard H. Allen (1893–1957), American state secretary of agriculture
Willard Myron Allen (1904–1993), American gynecologist
Willard W. Allen (1888–2007), director of the NAACP